Friedrich Ernst Martin Wield (15 March 1880, Hamburg - 10 June 1940, Hamburg) was a German sculptor.

Life and work 

He was the second son born to Christian Wield, a Master carpenter, and his wife, Johanna née Deest. In 1896, after attending the Kunstgewerbeschule, he served an apprenticeship with the sculptor, Walter Zehle (1865-1940). In 1900, following a study trip to Paris, he began working with Wilhelm von Rümann at the Academy of Fine Arts, Munich. He would stay there for three years.

While there, he made the acquaintance of Auguste Rodin. In 1908, he took an extended trip to Italy. The following year, he had an exhibition at the Société Nationale des Beaux-Arts. After being deferred from active military service in Germany, for health reasons, he returned to Hamburg, and worked in a reserve unit there from 1915 to 1918.

When the Nazis came to power, they cancelled the commission, due to Hertz's Jewish ancestry, and refused to pay Wield for the work he had already done. From that point on, he would experience increasingly serious financial difficulties.

Due to the restrictions on his creative freedom that had reduced him to poverty, he committed suicide in 1940. He was buried at the Ohlsdorf Cemetery. His grave was adorned with a "Crucifixion" he had created in 1938.

In 1994, thanks to efforts by the art dealer, his unfinished monument to Hertz was completed, from the original sketches and molds, by the sculptor . Since 2016, it has been on display at the headquarters of the Norddeutscher Rundfunk

References

Further reading 
 Roland Jaeger and Cornelius Steckner: Zinnober Kunstszene Hamburg von 1919 bis 1933, Szene, Hamburg 1983 
 Maike Bruhns: Kunst in der Krise. Vol.2: Künstlerlexikon Hamburg 1933–1945. Dölling und Galitz, 2001,

External links 

 
 Biography of Wield @ Hamburger Persönlichkeiten

1880 births
1940 deaths
German sculptors
Academy of Fine Arts, Munich alumni
Sculptors who committed suicide
Artists from Hamburg